Marcus Lewis may refer to:

 Marcus Lewis (basketball, born 1986), basketball player in Israel, former NBA D-League player
 Marcus Lewis (basketball, born 1992), basketball player in Greece, former player in Canada and Finland